Jack Wagner may refer to:

Jack Wagner (screenwriter) (1891–1963), U.S. screenwriter
Jack Wagner (announcer) (1925–1995), announcer for Disney theme parks
Jack Wagner (politician) (born 1948), former Auditor General of Pennsylvania
Jack Wagner (actor) (born 1959), actor and singer
Jack Wagner (director) (born 1989), director and podcast host

See also
John Wagner (disambiguation)
Jack Wrangler (1946–2009), American actor